Thecophora pusilla is a species belonging to the family Conopidae subfamily Myopinae.

Taxonomy
Some authors consider Thecophora pusilla a synonym of Thecophora cinerascens Meigen, 1804.

Distribution
This species is mainly present in most of Europe (Albania, Austria, Belgium, Bulgaria, Czech Republic, Denmark, Finland, France, Germany, Hungary, Italy, Lithuania, Norway, Poland, Romania, Slovakia, Spain, Switzerland and The Netherlands).

Description
. 
This species appears to be highly variable. Thorax and abdomen of this very small conopid is mainly greyish-black, with a broad and relatively high theca in the females. On mesonotum submedial dorsal stripes are absent or very weakly developed. The head is quite large, with large reddish eyes. The lower part of frons is pale, while the upper part and the ocellar triangle are uniformly black. The snout is elongated with narrow white cheeks, Femurs 1 and 2 are black, while femur 3 is pale on its basal half. Tibiae are pale only near the base. The wings are blackish, but the base is yellowed.

Biology
The adults of this fly can be encountered feeding on nectar of flowers of various plants (Crepis biennis, Papaver rhoeas, etc). Their larvae are endoparasites of small solitary bees.

References

 Smith, K.G.V. (1969) - Diptera: Conopidae - Handbooks for the Identification of British Insects

Conopidae
Insects described in 1824
Endoparasites